West Kallada  is a village in Kollam district in the state of Kerala, India.

Demographics
 India census, West Kallada had a population of 17,958 with 8,705 males and 9,253 females.

Kallada Valiyapally
St. Mary's Orthodox Syrian Church at West Kallada is one of the most important pilgrimage centres in the Malankara Church. The Church has a history dating from AD 9th century.

The history of this Church  mentioned in the Church records held by Pulikottil Mar Dionyius ( former supreme head of malankara orthodox church) and Chitramezhuthu KM Varghese show how the first Church in Kallada was destroyed by internecine feud between the Karthas of east Kallada and west Kallada and how a matriarch of Thulassery Manapurathu family recovered the cross of the destroyed Church from the river and prevailed on Avani Rajni (Queen of west Kallada) to allot some land for building a new Church. She was won over by handsome gifts of precious stones by the members of Thulassery Manapurathu Tharavad.The Kallada St Mary's ValiyaPalli  also  known as Thulassery Manapurathu Marthamariyam Church was established by the  descendants of the West Asian migration to Kollam in 9th century AD.
The prominence given to the Marthamariam church horse in the ‘kettukaazhcha’ festival stands as a glowing testimony to the enviable position enjoyed by the Church as well as the communal harmony that prevailed during the time.  Priests belonging to twenty three generations of ThulasseryManapurathu have been laid to rest within the 'holy of holies'  ( Madbaha) of Kallada ValiyaPalli just beside the mortal remains of Mar Anthrayos . The twenty fourth generation priest of ThulasseryManapurathu Rev. Fr. Mathai Kathanar was laid to rest beside the 'holy of holies'/ Chancel (Madbaha )of the Kallada ValiyaPalli.

The Tomb of Mar Anthrayos Bava (കല്ലട വല്യപ്പൂപ്പന്‍) is in this church. So the Church called Mar Anthrayos Pilgrim Church.

Mar Andrews also called Kallada Valiyappoon reached Mulanhthurthy in 1678 along with his three brothers, one of whom was a Ramban. He stayed for a long period there but later travelled eastward because of the non-cooperation of some of the inhabitants of the land.

He reached Vettikkal which was a trading centre between Kochi and Travancore. There, he found a chapel. He acquired a small piece of land near to it and started living there. 

One of the brothers who were with him got married and continued to live in Mulanthuruthy. The Parumala Thirumeni and the Holy Kattumangadu Bavas who are born in this ancestry.

From Vettikkal Mar Andréws Bava travelled to Kuruppampadi, Puthenkavu, Manarkadu and from there to Kallada. A Christian church in the name of Mother Mary which was established in AD 9th century was present here. The antiquity of this shrine attracted Mar Andrews Bava. The members of Thulassery Manapurathu Tharavad who were the traditional priests of the Kallada Valiyapally welcomed and took care of Andrews Bawa  who stayed in the Tharavad's  'meda' .   His last days were spent at Kallada.

When he expired, his body was buried below the Madbaha of the shrine. That many people received blessings through his intercession was a testimony to his saintliness. He died on the Kumbham 19th of the Malayalam calendar and so his commemoration feast is celebrated on that day.

Mar Andrews Commemoration Festival at St. Mary's Orthodox Syrian Church, West Kallada is celebrated on March 1,2,3(Malayalam month of Kumbham 18th and 19th).

Thiruvatta Temple 
Thiruvatta Temple (Malayalam: തിരുവാറ്റ ശ്രീ മഹാദേവർ   ക്ഷേത്രം ) is an ancient Hindu temple dedicated to Shiva at Westkallada

Educational guidelines 

Govt. HSS, West Kallada.
Government UPS,  Valiyapadam
Govt. L. P. School, Kothapuram.
Govt. L. P. School, Kanatharkunnam.

Hospitals

Govt Ayurvedic Hospital, West Kallada
Govt Veterinary  Hospital, West Kallada
Primary Health Center, Aithottuva, West Kallada
Primary Health Center, Koikkalbhagom, West Kallada

Main cultural institutions

Sri Kumbalath Sankupilla Smaraka Grandhasala, Karali junction
Abhiraj Grandhasala, Kanatharkunnam
V.K.S. Grandhasala Aithottuva.
Chintha Grandhasala Ulluruppu
Nalandha Library, Thottathilkadav
Navodaya Grandhasala, Kadapuzha
E.M.S. Grandhasala, Valiayapadam west, Vilanthara.
Gramam. Grandhasala, Valiayapadam, Vilanthara.
C.K. Thankappan Smaraka Grandhasala, Aithottuva.
P.K. Raghvan Smaraka Grandhasala, Aithottuva.
Kadisseril Achyuthan Pilla Smaraka Grandhasala, Aithottuva
Priyadarsini  Grandhasala, Aithottuva
T.P. Sadanandan Smaraka  Grandhasala, Aithottuva.
Mathrubhumi Study Circle ( Mathrubhumi Arts and sports club), Aithottuva.

Government service centers

Akshaya- E- Center
St Antonys Building, Karali Junction
Jana Seva Kendra, thengumthara junction, Aithottuva

Festivals 
 Kallada Jalotsavam (കല്ലട ജലോത്സവം)
 Vallam Kali (boat race) held on the Kallada River
Thaipooya kavadi at kodumthuruthil tempkle
kanakkathara bhadrakali temple ulsavam
kavadi, soolamkuth kodumthuruthil subrahmanya kshethram
Thalayinakaav Temple ( Thrisoola pooja in every Saturday).
 Parambil umamaheswara Temple (uthram thirunaal mahotsav)

Popular Games 
 Kabaddi
 Gulan Perish ( Twenty-eight (card game) )
 Cricket
 Football
Volley Ball

References

 Dr.Deepu Haridas {BAMS} {ISM}

External links
Sri Kumbalath Sankupilla

Villages in Kollam district